Dorte (and its variants Dorthe and Dort(h)ea) is a feminine given name which is mostly used in Denmark. The name is Danish variant of Greek given name Dorothea and is a combination of the words gift and god. Its German variant is Dörte and its English version is Dorothy.

Notable people with the name are as follows:

Dorte

First name
Dorte Bennedsen (1938–2016), Danish theologian and politician
Dorte Christensen, Danish cricket player
Dorte Christiansen, Danish cricket player
Dorte Dahlin (born 1955), Danish artist 
Dorte Ekner (born 1951), Danish tennis player
Dorte Hammershøi, Danish academic
Dorte Jensdatter (1672–1722), Danish murder victim
Dorte Jensen (born 1972), Danish sailor
Dorte Dalum Jensen (born 1978), Danish football player
Dorte Juul Jensen (born 1957), Danish scientist 
Dorte Kjær (born 1964), Danish badminton player
Dorte Lohse (born 1971), Danish road cyclist
Dorte Mandrup (born 1961), Danish architect
Dorte Olesen (born 1948), Danish mathematician
Dorte Rasmussen, multiple people

Middle name
Ann-Dorte Christensen, Danish academic
Anne Dorte Michelsen (born 1958), Danish musical artist
Countess Anne Dorte of Rosenborg (1947–2014), Danish noble

Dörte
Dörte Gatermann (born 1956), German architect 
Dörte Haftendorn (born 1948), German mathematician
Dörte Hansen (born 1964), German linguist, journalist and writer
Dörte Helm, also Dorothea Helm, (1898–1941), German painter and graphic designer
Dörte Lindner (born 1974), German diver
Dörte Stüdemann (born 1964), German volleyball player
Dörte Thümmler (born 1971), German gymnast
Dörte von Westernhagen (born 1943), German writer
Dörte Clara Wolff, known as Dodo (painter) (1907–1998), German painter and illustrator

References

Danish feminine given names
German feminine given names